Julio Peralta and Horacio Zeballos were the defending champions but chose not to defend their title.

Franco Agamenone and Facundo Argüello won the title after defeating Máximo González and Nicolás Jarry 6–4, 3–6, [10–6] in the final.

Seeds

Draw

References
 Main Draw

Santiago Challenger - Doubles